Republic of the Congo first competed at the Paralympic Games in 2016, at the Summer Games in Rio de Janeiro, sending one wheelchair athletes to compete in track and field events.
The Congo has never taken part in the Winter Paralympic Games, and no athlete from this country has ever won a Paralympic medal.

Medal tables

Medals by Summer Games

See also
 Congo at the Olympics

References

 
Sport in the Republic of the Congo